The 2004–2006 European Nations Cup was the fifth edition of the newly reformed European Championship for tier 2 & 3 Rugby Union Nations.

First division was played with a  regular tournament.

In  2004–05 Season, the team of second and third division play the first two round of European qualification for RWC 2007

The team defeated in the first round and two new teams (Azerbaijan) and Armenia) played a "challenge", that wasn't completed.

In 2005–06 a tournament was regularly played by the team excluded from third round of European qualification for RWC 2007

Pool A 
The highest level was the Pool "A", with five teams, the best runner-up of RWC qualification

Table

  promoted to division 2
  relegated to group B

Results

Pool B-C playoff 

Preliminary play off was played between 6 team in two round, with two worst team of RWC 2007 qualification admitted to second round

First round

Second round

Pool B 
The middle level was the Pool "B", with five teams:

Table

  promoted to group A
  relegated to group C

Results

Pool C 
Participating:

Table

  promoted to group B
  relegated to group D

Group D 

   Promoted to pool C

See also 
 2004–2006 European Nations Cup First Division
 2007 Rugby World Cup – Europe qualification

Sources

www.irb.com

2004–06
2004–05 in European rugby union
2005–06 in European rugby union